Patania aegrotalis is a moth in the family Crambidae. It was described by Zeller in 1852. It is found in the Democratic Republic of the Congo, Ethiopia, South Africa, Gambia, Yemen and possibly the Seychelles.

References

Moths described in 1852
Moths of Africa
Moths of Asia
Spilomelinae
Taxa named by Philipp Christoph Zeller